Tara Jayne Sands is an American voice actress and co-host of Cartoon Network's Fridays from 2005 to 2007. Sands has voiced in anime dubs and cartoons, including Bulbasaur in the Pokémon anime series, Spyler in the US dub of I Spy, Kari Kamiya in Digimon Adventure tri., Anna Kyoyama in Shaman King, Mokuba Kaiba in Yu-Gi-Oh! Duel Monsters, as well as Chase on Fighting Foodons and Filia Ul Copt in Slayers. She also provides narration on audio books.

Biography 

Much of Sands' work is in anime dubbing, with multiple roles in franchises such as Pokémon, Slayers, Yugioh, Digimon Adventure Tri, and Hunter x Hunter. She has worked for 4Kids Entertainment, Bang Zoom!, Funimation, TAJ Productions, NYAV Post, Studiopolis, Central Park Media, and VSI Los Angeles.

Sands has narrated over 200 audio books, including Wendelin Van Draanen's Sammy Keyes series, After I Do by Taylor Jenkins Reid, and two books in the Goosebumps series by R. L. Stine: Welcome to Dead House and One Day at HorrorLand.

In addition to providing voice-overs for commercials, Sands was co-host of Cartoon Network Fridays for over 100 episodes.

As of 2021, Sands provides the voice for "sidekick" Joan of Arc in the Forever Dog podcast Godcast.

Filmography

Live action 

 Disjointed - Sadie, Plants (voice)
 Fridays (Cartoon Network) - Co-Host
 Everybody Hates Chris - Hotel Clerk, Waitress
 The Fresh Beat Band - Interviewer
 The Sarah Silverman Program - Campaign Manager
 The Newsroom - Secretary

Anime 

 Agent Aika - Ria
 Angel Sanctuary - Sara Mudo
 Anohana: The Flower We Saw That Day - Jinta "Jintan" Yodomi (Child)
 Beyblade Burst Turbo - Tobisuke
 Descendants of Darkness - Princess Tsubaki
 Dinosaur King - Michelle
 Domain of Murder - Keita Toyama
 Durarara!! - Masaomi Kida (Young), Additional Voices
 Fencer of Minerva - Diana
 Fighting Foodons - Chase
 Geobreeders - Eiko Rando
 Ghost Talker's Daydream - Anzai
 Girls Bravo - Nanase Koh Haruka, Reporter (Ep. 21)
 The God of High School - Sai, Sumi Yoo
 High School Prodigies Have It Easy Even In Another World - Winona
 Hunter × Hunter - Biscuit Krueger
 Isekai Cheat Magician - Lemia, Aerial
 JoJo's Bizarre Adventure - Death 13, Old Hag (Bastet arc)
 Jujutsu Kaisen - Utahime Iori, Momo Nishimiya
 Jungle Emperor Leo - Lune/Rune
 Knights of Ramune - PQ
 Kirby: Right Back at Ya! - Fololo, Falala (4Kids Version)
 Legend of Himiko - Tadami
 Little Witch Academia - Woodward, Lotte's Mother, Party Guest
 Maze - Solude Schfoltzer
 Mobile Suit Gundam Thunderbolt - Karla Mitchum
 My Hero Academia - Curious
 Naruto Shippuden - Yota, Tamao, Young Kabuto (Ep. 335 and 336)
 No Guns Life - Anne
 One Piece - Miss Kaya (4Kids dub)
 One Punch Man - Kombu Infinity
 Patlabor: The Mobile Police - Takeo Kumagami
 Photon - Aun Freya
 Pokémon (anime) - multiple characters (seasons 1-8) including Bulbasaur, Phanpy, Larvitar, Clefairy, Bugsy, Jasmine, Cissy, Ritchie
 Pokémon 4Ever: Celebi, the Voice of the Forest - Sam
 Pokémon Heroes: Latios & Latias - Bianca
 Pokémon: Destiny Deoxys - Tory Lund
 Pretty Guardian Sailor Moon Crystal - Kotono Sarashina (Eps. 15 and 18)
 Rayearth - Hikaru Shidou
 Rent-A-Girlfriend - Imai
 Revolutionary Girl Utena - Tokiko Chida
 Rurouni Kenshin - Seta Sōjirō, Osamu Masukami (as Tara Jayne)Saint Seiya: The Lost Canvas - Yuzuriha
 Samurai Deeper Kyo - Santera
 The Seven Deadly Sins - Luigi
 Shaman King - Anna Kyoyama, Opacho
 Shamanic Princess - Tiara
 Shrine of the Morning Mist - Tadahiro Amatsu (Child), Tama Hieda
 Shura no Toki: Age of Chaos - Kesshomaru/Shiori
 Sailor Moon - Yumemi Yumeno (Ep. 28, Viz Media dub)
 Slayers Try - Filia Ul Copt (as Tara Jayne)
 Spirit Warrior - Asura
 Stitch! - Audrey
 Tiger & Bunny - Ms. Violet
 Time Bokan - Ohana, Yatterman (1&2)
 To Heart - Multi
 Ultraman - Rena Sayama
 Yu-Gi-Oh! Duel Monsters - Mokuba Kaiba
 Yashahime: Princess Half-Demon - Raita

 Animation 

 Barbie: Life in the Dreamhouse - Summer
 Barbie Dreamhouse Adventures - Dreamhouse Door
 Danger Rangers - Additional Voices
 Electric City - Roger Moore
 Enchantimals: Tales of Everwilde - Danessa Deer, Larissa Lemer
 Generator Rex - Circe
 I Spy (HBO animated series) - Spyler (as Tara Jayne)
 Phineas and Ferb - Danielle
 Pinkfong Wonderstar - Jeni and Rachel

 Shadow of the Elves - Nayade, Rowan
 Supernormal - Buzz Girl, Eric's Mom
 Rainbow High (Youtube animated series) - Ruby Anderson, Ms. Pamela Morton
 Team Umizoomi - Horse
 Teenage Mutant Ninja Turtles (2003 TV series) - Angel (Season 1-4), Tyler
 Valt the Wonder Deer - Trika
 Welcome to Eltingville - Jane

 Films 

 Ah! My Goddess: The Movie - Chrono
 Digimon Adventure tri. - Kari Kamiya (Hikari Yagami), Homeostasis
 Digimon Adventure: Last Evolution Kizuna - Kari Kamiya (Hikari Yagami), Ayaka, Newswoman
 Ice Age: Continental Drift - Additional Voices
 My Kid Could Paint That - Voice Over Talent
 Scooby-Doo! Stage Fright - Nancy
 Sailor Moon Super S: The Movie - Queen Badiane (Viz Media/Studiopolis Dub)
 The Orbital Children - Mina Misasa
 Time of Eve - Naoko Sakisaka
 Yu-Gi-Oh!: The Dark Side of Dimensions - Mokuba Kaiba

 Video games 

 Danganronpa Another Episode: Ultra Despair Girls - Masaru Daimon
 Dead Island - Jin, Various Characters
 Final Fantasy Type-0 - Additional Voices
 Infamous Second Son - Activist
 Lightning Returns: Final Fantasy XIII - Additional Voices
 Pokémon Channel - Smoochum, Teddiursa
 Scarlet Nexus - Additional voices
 Singularity - Additional English Voice TalentValkyria Chronicles 4 - Teresa Leach, Rebecca Longhurst, RosieFire Emblem Echoes: Shadows of Valentia - SonyaFire Emblem Heroes - Sonya, Olwen (Righteous Knight)Fire Emblem Warriors: Three Hopes - Additional voicesNier: Automata - Additional voicesNier Replicant ver.1.22474487139... - Red-Bag Woman, additional voicesOne-Punch Man: A Hero Nobody Knows - Child EmperorRelayer - Additional voicesResident Evil: Resistance'' - Becca Woolett

Podcasts 

 Godcast - Joan of Arc

References

External links 

20th-century American actresses
21st-century American actresses
audiobook narrators
American voice actresses
American television hosts
American television actresses
American video game actresses
actresses from Los Angeles
actresses from New Jersey
Hofstra University alumni
living people
people from New Jersey
American women television presenters
year of birth missing (living people)